Ultra. Rock Remixed is a mixed dance/rock compilation album from Ultra Records. It was mixed by Tommie Sunshine and released on March 20, 2007.

Track listing 
Disc one:
"The Only Difference Between Martyrdom and Suicide Is Press Coverage [Tommie Sunshine's Brooklyn Fire Retouch]" - Panic! at the Disco
"Wine Red [Tommie Sunshine's Brooklyn Fire Retouch]" - The Hush Sound
"Jealous Girls [Tommie Sunshine Mix]" - The Gossip
"Tony the Beat [T.S. 12" Maxi Vocal]" - The Sounds
"Night on Fire [Tommie Sunshine's Brooklyn Fire Retouch]" - VHS or Beta
"Mama's Room [Tommie Sunshine's Brooklyn Fire Retouch]" - Under the Influence of Giants
"Here (In Your Arms) [TS 12" Remix]" - Hellogoodbye
"Emotion Commotion" - Glitch
"Straight to Video [TSMV Remix]" - Mindless Self Indulgence
"Lips Like Morphine [Tommie Sunshine's Brooklyn Fire Retouch]" - Kill Hannah
"23 Minutes in Brussels [Tommie Sunshine's Brooklyn Fire Retouch]" - My Robot Friend
"Limit of Your Mind" - Tommie Sunshine

Disc two:
"Dance Among the Ruins" - Tommie Sunshine
"Le Disko [Tommie Sunshine's Brooklyn Fire & Brimstone Dub] - Shiny Toy Guns 	
"Body Jack [Tommie Sunshine Remix] - Marc Romboy
"Dance Dance [Tommie Sunshine's Brooklyn Fire Retouch] - Fall Out Boy
"I Just Wanna Live [Tommie Sunshine's Brooklyn Fire Retouch] - Good Charlotte
"Running From" - John Acquaviva & Madox
"Let the Poison Spill from Your Throat [Tommie Sunshine's 'Let The Clock Punch' Redux] - The Faint
"Boys Wanna Be Her [Tommie Sunshine's Brooklyn Fire Retouch]" - Peaches
"Tokyo Pollution" - Tommie Sunshine
"At Home He's a Tourist [Tommie Sunshine's Brooklyn Fire Retouch]" - Gang of Four
"Will You [Tommie Sunshine Remix]" - P.O.D.
"Y Control [Tommie Sunshine Remix]" - Yeah Yeah Yeahs

References

External links

 Ultra.Rock Remixed at Amazon

2007 compilation albums
Ultra Records albums